Sammel is the surname of:
David Sammel (born 1961), South African tennis coach and author
Gwynn Sammel, South African tennis player, silver medalist at 1977 Surrey Championships
Hans-Joachim Sammel, German footballer in 1. FC Union Berlin in 1970–1971
Kadri Sammel, Estonian musician in industrial band Forgotten Sunrise
Jutta Sammel, child actor in French-Swiss film Let's Dance (2007)
Mary D. Sammel, American biostatistician
Richard Sammel (born 1960), German actor

See also
Battle of Sammel, fought in 1544 in India